Berenbaum is a surname. Notable people with the surname include:

 Abe Berenbaum, American international table tennis player
 David Berenbaum, actor
 May Berenbaum (born 1953), American entomologist
 Michael Berenbaum (born 1945), American academic, writer, and film director
 Shmuel Berenbaum (1920–2008), American rabbi

See also 
 Barenboim
 Bernbaum
 Birnbaum (surname)

Jewish surnames
Yiddish-language surnames

de:Berenbaum